Prince Murat is a French princely title that traces its origin back to 1804, when Emperor Napoleon granted the rank of prince français to his brother-in-law Joachim Murat, who subsequently reigned as King of Naples from 1808 to 1815. On 5 December 1812, Joachim Murat's second son Lucien was created sovereign Prince of Pontecorvo (an enclave in the Kingdom of Naples) in succession to Jean-Baptiste Jules Bernadotte, by an Imperial Decree.

The Prince of Pontecorvo title is still used to this day for the heir apparent of the head of the family. The Murat family is known collectively as the House of Murat.

Heads of the family

The heir apparent is the current head of the family's only son, Joachim, Prince of Pontecorvo (born 3 May 1973).

References

External links
 Official website of the House of Murat
 History of the Princes Murat

 
Murat